Legion M (founded 2016) is a production company that makes movies.

History 
Legion M was founded by Paul Scanlan and Jeff Annison in March, 2016. Legion M is the world's first entertainment studio that "allows fans to invest in and be part of the creation of new movies, television shows, virtual reality and other pieces of entertainment content" after the SEC passed Title IV of the JOBS Act, which allowed non-accredited investors to make investments in small businesses. Legion M is currently partnered with Seth Green, co-creator of TV series Robot Chicken, Gaston Dominguez of Meltdown Entertainment, and gaming studio Animal Repair Show.

Legion M partnered with Alamo Drafthouse Cinema for distribution and marketing purposes.

On August 14, 2016, Legion M closed its initial funding round with $1,000,000 coming from over 3,000 investors.

Legion M worked with the SEC to launch their 2nd funding round as a Reg A+ in March 2017. due to higher funding thresholds and attracting more investors. 

On May 16, 2018, Legion M went public.

On December 12, 2018, Legion M and Chicken Soup for the Soul Entertainment ("CSS Entertainment") announced the formation of an agreement to produce television shows for their audience.

References

External links 
 
 Legion M Forum
 Jeff Annison and David Baxter of Legion M on the Super Hero Speak podcast from NYCC 2019

American companies established in 2016
Entertainment companies based in California